Serghei Gafina (born 10 November 1984) is a Moldovan footballer who plays as a defender for Dinamo-Auto Tiraspol in the Moldovan National Division. He has previously played for Iskra-Stal Rîbnița, Zimbru Chișinău and Iskra Rîbnița.

References
https://archive.today/20140215191333/http://www.zimbru.md/serghei_gafina/statistics/
http://eu-football.info/_player.php?id=24562

External links

1984 births
Living people
Moldovan footballers
FC Zimbru Chișinău players
FC Iskra-Stal players
FC Dinamo-Auto Tiraspol players
Moldovan Super Liga players
Association football defenders
Moldova international footballers